Miramar High School is a public high school located in Miramar, Florida. The school opened in 1970 and serves students residing in southwest Broward County; however, magnet students may hail from elsewhere in the county.

Miramar High School serves grades 9 through 12. The school houses two magnet programs: an Aviation program and the International Baccalaureate program. Miramar has an FCAT school grade of "A" for the academic year ending 2011, up from "B" the year before.

Athletics

Soccer
Miramar High established Broward County's first boys' soccer program in 1974.

Football

Miramar-Flanagan Brawl (2007) 
On September 28, 2007 at Miramar High's stadium, a bench-clearing brawl between seated, rival footballers occurred that interrupted the Miramar-Flanagan football game; this was Broward County's largest on-field brawl. The game was stopped by a referee because of the possibility that further outbreaks on the field and bleachers would erupt.

Following the interruption of the game, a film of the occurrence was sent to the Florida High School Athletic Association (FHSAA) to decide the fate of the belligerent parties. The FHSAA suspended 28 Miramar players and 26 Flanagan players from playing. In addition, both schools were fined by the State of Florida a total of $12,150  and neither school was allowed to participate in the 2008 Spring Jamboree and 2008 Fall Pre-season Jamboree.

The game  resumed on October 29, 2007 in an empty Lockhart Stadium with five minutes remaining in the third quarter with Miramar leading 20–7. The game was played without the 54 suspended players. This incident is thought to be the largest mass-suspension in state high school history.

State Championship (2009)
Miramar High School won their first State Championship title on Dec 19, 2009. Miramar High School beat DeLand High School of DeLand, Florida 42–20. Quarterback Ryan Williams set a state championship game record with 5 TD passes and a completion percentage record of .857, going 18 of 21 for 254 yards.  Miramar High was the first team from Broward County to win a 6A state championship and the first in the county to win in the largest classification since Hollywood Hills won 4A in 1973.

Miramar High's athletic rival is Everglades High School.

Demographics
As of the 2021-22 school year, the total student enrollment was 2,095. The ethnic makeup of the school was 15.3% White, 80.5% Black, 13.7% Hispanic, 1.8% Asian, 1.9% Multiracial, 0.2% Native American or Native Alaskan, and 0.3% Native Hawaiian or Pacific Islander.

Notable alumni 
 Johnny Depp - Actor
 Stedman Bailey - NFL wide receiver.
 Jesse Bendross - NFL wide receiver.
 Dean Biasucci - National Football League (NFL) placekicker.
 Clarence Coleman - NFL wide receiver.
 Trevon Coley - NFL defensive tackle.
 Justin Francis - NFL defensive end.
 Jermaine Grace - NFL linebacker
 Tracy Howard - NFL defensive back.
 Shemar Jean-Charles - NFL cornerback
 Kahlil Lewis - XFL wide receiver
Malcolm Lewis - NFL wide receiver
Herb Miller   - NFL cornerback
 Geno Smith - NFL quarterback.
Ernie Mussatto - CFL runningback

References

External links 

Educational institutions established in 1968
Broward County Public Schools
High schools in Broward County, Florida
Public high schools in Florida
Miramar, Florida
1968 establishments in Florida
International Baccalaureate schools in Florida